The Jaguar R4 is a Formula One car with which Jaguar Racing competed in the 2003 Formula One season. It was driven by Mark Webber, Antônio Pizzonia and Justin Wilson.

After three years in Formula One, and amid a turbulent atmosphere that had claimed the leaderships of Niki Lauda and Bobby Rahal, Jaguar Racing became much more stable in 2003. Now led by Tony Purnell and David Pitchforth, results – previously elusive – were a priority. At the end of 2002 Eddie Irvine was out of contract and retired from Formula One, and Pedro de la Rosa was negotiated out of his standing contract. New drivers Mark Webber and Antônio Pizzonia were drafted into the team and the entirety of the management team was re-structured.

The car was also revamped, with the R4 representing a fresh approach compared to the previous season's R3. Its designers focused on producing a much stiffer chassis, and aimed to root out problems during the pre-season with a concerted programme of on-track testing and factory work.

2003 season
Despite the priority on testing, the new R4 was barely ready for the 2003 season, having covered comparatively few miles as a finished package. Reliability problems had caused delays, although engine suppliers Cosworth performed well by supplying the team with engines for the hybrid chassis and testing.

At the Brazilian Grand Prix Webber crashed heavily, triggering an incident that led to the race being red flagged. Webber's commitment and determination was a boost to the team, recording several sixth- and seventh-place finishes en-route to a Constructors' Championship finish of sixth. Pizzonia lagged far behind, despite his experience and the car's performance as demonstrated by Webber's results.

Pizzonia issues
After the Spanish Grand Prix Antônio Pizzonia's seat was under threat and it was reported widely that Jaguar wanted to snap up experienced McLaren test driver Alexander Wurz. However this came to nothing, as McLaren wanted Wurz's experience in developing its new car and retained the Austrian as test driver. This left Jaguar in a tricky position, backtracking and apologising with Pizzônia remaining in the car until the British Grand Prix. This was his most convincing drive of the season, but Jaguar replaced him with Justin Wilson from the Minardi team.

Sponsorship and livery 
In Monaco, Jaguar took the unique decision to re-colour its signature-leaping cat pink in celebration of the Steinmetz Flawless Diamond Collection and the presentation of the Steinmetz Pink - a 59.60 carat natural, pink diamond. At the British Grand Prix, both Jaguar cars had the Terminator 3 livery.

In the 2003 season Jaguar were sponsored by  AT&T, Beck's, Castrol, DuPont, EDS, HP, HSBC, Japhiro, Lear, Michelin, MSC Software, Mumm, Pioneer, Puma, Rolex, Volvo and 3D Systems.

Complete Formula One results
(key)

References

Jaguar Formula One cars
2003 Formula One season cars